"Beautiful Life" is a song by Swedish band Ace of Base, released on  October 20, 1995 from their second album, The Bridge (1995). In North America, it was the first single released from the album; in Europe, it followed "Lucky Love" as the second single. Co-written by band member Jonas Berggren and produced by him with Denniz Pop and Max Martin, the single reached number 15 on both the US Billboard Hot 100 and the UK Singles Chart in December 1995. But it hit number one on the Canadian RPM Dance/Urban chart and Billboards Hot Dance Club Play chart. In 2017, BuzzFeed ranked "Beautiful Life" number 51 in their list of The 101 Greatest Dance Songs Of the '90s.

Background and release

The song was written on January 1, 1994 by band member Jonas Berggren while he was in the Canary Islands. At the time, "The Sign" had reached number one on the US Billboard Hot 100 chart, which inspired him to write the song. On a late flight home he heard some chords, and started humming, and there the song was made. He had to record it swiftly so he wouldn't forget it. Berggren incorporated gospel elements into the song and the roof-raising gospel singing toward the end was made by a four-piece female group that Denniz Pop had. They tracked those vocals many times over for maximum soulful impact.

In a 2018 interview, Ulf Ekberg told that Michael Jackson, after asking to meet the band when they performed "Beautiful Life" at World Music Awards in Monaco, told them that he thought that it was the best song that he had heard in so many years.

Critical reception
J.D. Considine from The Baltimore Sun described "Beautiful Life" as "techno-tinged", adding that it "tempers its impetuous pulse and seemingly happy message with a memorably sad melody." Larry Flick from Billboard deemed it a "jaunty, incredibly catchy li'l ditty that indulges in Euro-NRG dance rhythms while continuing to mine the ABBA-esque pop melodies". He stated that "even the act's detractors will find it impossible to resist the sugar-coated confection, with shoulder-shaking percussion and sing-along chorus." Steve Baltin from Cash Box called it "ridiculous", noting that "for this track, the quartet has jumped into this decade with a rocking dance beat that embodies the group's European heritage." The Daily Vault's Michael R. Smith declared it as a "high-octane techno gem". Dave Sholin from the Gavin Report commented, "Those asking the musical question—can Ace Of Base repeat? The answer is Yes! Yes! Yes!" Pan-European magazine Music & Media said the song has a "hyper-kinetic rhythm topped off by a killer hook that's part of your system before you realise it." A reviewer from Music Week rated it three out of five, noting the band's "switch from light reggae to pure Europop" and describing it as "uplifting but unremarkable." 

Neil Strauss from The New York Times felt it is "pure treacly pleasure, with bubbling keyboards and a fast, chirpy rhythm that will inspire most listeners to forget that the 70's ever ended and accept the chorus – "It's a beautiful life"—for one night of disco-era hedonism." Bob Waliszewski of Plugged In viewed it as "a joyful admonition to hang tough when times get hard." J.D. Considine for Spin magazine noted in a writeup about The Bridge that "the real genius of Ace of Base lies not with perky singing... but with the ability to make melancholy sound so damned appealing." The evaluation continues to narrow in scope as he continues to say "even the cheerfully titled 'Beautiful life' dampens its club-savvy stomp with a heartbreaking minor key chorus." A reviewer from People Magazine opined that it "offers a blast of jumpy techno". Chuck Campbell from Scripps Howard News Service said that it is "contagious" and "a high-energy dance song that rings with unbridled optimism (and eschews the reggae cadence of the group's previous American hits)." He added that "the Berggren sisters sing in ABBA-esque exclamation points on the song."

Chart performance
"Beautiful Life" was very successful worldwide, reaching number-one both on the RPM Dance/Urban chart in Canada and the Billboard Hot Dance Club Play chart in the United States. In Europe, it made it to the top 10 in Denmark, Finland, France, Hungary and Lithuania, as well as on the Eurochart Hot 100 and MTV's European Top 20, where it hit number nine and eight. Additionally, the single was a top 20 hit in Belgium, Germany, Ireland, Scotland and the United Kingdom. In the latter, it peaked at number 15 in its second week at the UK Singles Chart, on January 28, 1996. Outside Europe, "Beautiful Life" also reached number three on the RPM Top Singles chart in Canada, number 11 in Australia, number 15 on the Billboard Hot 100 and number ten on the Cash Box Top 100 in the US. It earned a gold record in Australia, with a sale of 35,000 singles.

Music video
The accompanying music video for the song was directed by British director Richard Heslop, who would go on to direct the band's later video for "Never Gonna Say I'm Sorry". The video was shot on YFO Studios in Gothenburg in October 1995. The music video included computer-generated bubbles which whisked the band from place to place. According to music channel VH1 in the United States, the band's record label, Arista Records, insisted the bubbles be removed from the video, leading to a somewhat strange-looking U.S. video, with the band members looking at (and reacting to) bubbles that were no longer there. In Europe, both versions of the video were released. In addition to the two alternate videos, remix videos were also created, and VH1 released a Pop-Up Video version of the video in 1998. "Beautiful Life" was uploaded to YouTube in January 2015. As of August 2022, the video has amassed more than 115 million views.

Track listings
 United Kingdom CD 1 and Australian CD
Beautiful Life (Single Version)
Beautiful Life (12" Extended Version)
Beautiful Life (Junior's Circuit Bump Mix)

 United Kingdom CD 2
Beautiful Life (Single Version)
Beautiful Life (Vission Lorimer Club Mix)
Beautiful Life (Lenny B.'s House of Joy Club Mix)
Beautiful Life (Uno Clio Mix)

 US maxi single
Beautiful Life (Single Version)
Beautiful Life (12" Extended Version)
Beautiful Life (Junior's Circuit Bump Mix)
Beautiful Life (Vission Lorimer Club Mix)
Beautiful Life (Lenny B's House Of Joy Club Mix)
Beautiful Life (Uno Clio Mix)

Charts

Weekly charts

Year-end charts

Certifications

Personnel
 Vocals by Linn Berggren, Jenny Berggren
 Backing Vocals and cue choir by Jeanette Söderholm
 Music by Jonas Berggren
 Lyrics by Jonas Berggren and John Ballard
 Produced by Denniz Pop, Max Martin and Jonas Berggren
 Recorded and produced at Cheiron Studios

Release history

Cover versions
Indie band Jukebox The Ghost recorded a cover of the song for Engine Room Recordings' compilation album Guilt by Association Vol. 2, which was released in November 2008.

In 2015, the American dance-pop trio Punch !nc recorded a reimagined version of the song, titled "Heaven (Beautiful Life)."  This version has reached number six on Billboard's Dance Club Songs chart.

Russian metal cover project Even Blurry Videos released their version of the song on YouTube in November 2019.

Appearances in other media
 This song was included on the Night at the Roxbury (1998) soundtrack and was featured in the advertising campaign for the movie.
 The song was featured by the Filipino dance group "The Streetboys" (members like Vhong Navarro, Jhong Hilario and others) performed in the variety show in the Philippines, Eat Bulaga! in 1996.
 The song was used in a TV advertisement for Lincraft in Australia.
 The song was the first to be played the night that the Florida Marlins won Game 7 of the 1997 World Series.
 The song was also heard in the Adam Sandler films, I Now Pronounce You Chuck and Larry from 2007 and You Don't Mess With The Zohan from 2008.
 The Colombian latin pop singer Sara Tunes produced a new version of the song with a more electronic sound which has a rhythm similar to house music or dubstep, originally included on her second studio album, titled "XOXO".
 In the episode "The Eye of the Kong" of the web series Game Grumps, a MIDI version of the song is played as part of a montage.
 The song appeared on the episode from the TV show Hindsight, "Auld Lang Syne".
 The song featured on the soundtrack for Russian TV series Olga on TNT.
 The song is featured in the episode from the Netflix original series Everything Sucks!, "I Just Wanna Be Anybody".
 Wrestlers LJ Cleary, Nathan Martin and Darren Kearney, better known as More Then Hype, use this as an entrance theme when they come to the ring.
The song was featured in the first episode of  Impeachment: American Crime Story, in a scene where Monica Lewinsky (Beanie Feldstein) is exercising at a gym in early 1998.

References

External links

1995 singles
1995 songs
Ace of Base songs
Arista Records singles
Mega Records singles
Miami Marlins
Music videos directed by Richard Heslop
Song recordings produced by Denniz Pop
Song recordings produced by Max Martin
Songs written by John Ballard (record producer)
Songs written by Jonas Berggren